Moonford is a rural town and locality in the North Burnett Region, Queensland, Australia.

Geography
Cania Road, which provides access to Cania Gorge National Park and Cania Dam, runs north from the Burnett Highway through Moonford to Cania.

History 
In December 1933, tenders were called to erect Moonford State School. It opened on 5 June 1934. It was officially opened on 30 June 1934 by Tommy Williams, the local member of the Queensland Legislative Assembly for Port Curtis. It closed on 10 December 1982. It was at 551 Cania Road.

Christ Church Anglican was dedicated by Bishop George Halford on 1 November 1936. It closed circa 1988. It was at 539 Cania Road. As at 2021, the church building is still extant, but in private ownership.

Community groups 
The Moonford branch of the Queensland Country Women's Association meets at the CWA Hall at 32059 Burnett Highway.

References

Further reading

External links 

 

Towns in Queensland
North Burnett Region
Localities in Queensland